Dariusz Wdowczyk (born 25 September 1962) is a Polish football player and coach, who was previously the manager of Piast Gliwice. He played for Gwardia Warszawa, Legia Warsaw, Celtic, Reading, and Polonia Warsaw. He has subsequently carved out a career in football management. In the 2005/06 season he led Legia Warsaw to the league title.

On 13 April 2007 he was replaced as manager of Legia Warsaw by Jacek Zieliński, following a run of bad results.

He joined Livingston as Director of Football on 28 June 2007, to assist new manager Mark Proctor, his main objective was to investigate the foreign market, in particular the Eastern European market. It was announced on 30 October 2007 that Wdowczyk was to leave Livingston to embark on a second spell as manager of Polonia Warsaw.

Honours

Manager
Polonia Warszawa
 Ekstraklasa: 1999–2000
 Polish Cup: 2000-01
 Polish Super Cup: 2000

Legia Warsaw
 Ekstraklasa: 2005–06

References

External links

1962 births
Living people
Polish footballers
Legia Warsaw players
Celtic F.C. players
Reading F.C. players
Polonia Warsaw players
Poland youth international footballers
Poland international footballers
Association football fullbacks
Footballers from Warsaw
Polish expatriate footballers
Polish football managers
Legia Warsaw managers
Polonia Warsaw managers
Pogoń Szczecin managers
Widzew Łódź managers
Wisła Kraków managers
Piast Gliwice managers
Ekstraklasa players
Scottish Football League players
English Football League players
Expatriate footballers in England
Expatriate footballers in Scotland
Gwardia Warsaw players
Association football defenders
Livingston F.C. non-playing staff
Korona Kielce managers
Wisła Płock managers